Anarsia halimodendri is a moth in the family Gelechiidae. It was described by Hugo Theodor Christoph in 1877. It is found in Turkmenistan and Afghanistan.

The wingspan is about 7 mm. The forewings are light grey with reddish-white sprinkling. The hindwings are shining grey.

The larvae feed on Halimodendron eichvaldii. They are greyish green.

References

halimodendri
Moths described in 1877
Moths of Asia